Agonia may refer to:

 Latin word for Agony
 Passion (Christianity), also called the Agony of Christ
 Agonia (1969 film), a 1969 Greek drama film directed by Odysseas Kosteletos